Theodosius Wislocki (23 February 1738 – 28 April 1801) was a bishop of the Ruthenian Uniate Church, Bishop of Suprasl and all unites in New East Prussia.

After the third partition of Poland, on initiative of Theodosius Rostocki in 1778 Wislocki was appointed administrator of newly created Suprasl diocese (eparchy) which became part of the Prussian province of New East Prussia. It was not until 1800 when he was finally ordained on 27 April by Jesuit bishop John Baptist Albertrandi.

See also
 Supraśl Orthodox Monastery

References

External links
 Theodosius Wislocki at the catholic-hierarchy.org

1738 births
1801 deaths
People from Lesser Poland Voivodeship
Order of Saint Basil the Great
Polish people of Rusyn descent
Bishops of the Uniate Church of the Polish–Lithuanian Commonwealth